Ligandrol (VK5211, LGD-4033) is a novel nonsteroidal oral selective androgen receptor modulator (SARM) for treatment of conditions such as muscle wasting and osteoporosis, discovered by Ligand Pharmaceuticals and under development by Viking Therapeutics.

Ligandrol has been found in World Anti-Doping Agency (WADA) samples and in racehorses too. Like anabolic steroids, it can stimulate muscle growth. "SARMs have shown superior side effect profiles compared with anabolic steroids, which arguably makes them attractive for use by individuals seeking an unfair advantage over their competitors".

WADA control
At least since June 2015, ligandrol has been available via the internet. In that month, German scientists proposed a new test to detect its metabolites present in human urine, and suggested an expansion of the WADA regime.

Misbranded as dietary supplement
On 23 October 2017, a nutritional supplement company in Missouri called Infantry Labs was warned by the FDA that the distribution of two of its products violated the Federal Food, Drug, and Cosmetic Act. One of the substances was ligandrol. The company advertised as benefits of the ligandrol: "increases in lean body mass and decrease in body fat" and "increases in strength, well being, as well as healing possibilities". The company mislabeled as "dietary supplements" what should have been "new drugs" or "prescription drugs" and were instructed to document the steps they would take in order to cease the violation.
 
Also on 23 October 2017, the FDA sent a warning letter to a New Jersey company called Panther Sports Nutrition. The company's marketing approach for the product was similar to that of the Infantry Labs case, and the product was advertised as a "mass builder" and "physique enhancing agent".

Clinical Research 
According to a clinical trial conducted at the Boston Medical Center's Section of Endocrinology, Ligandrol can help improve lean body mass and muscle strength.

Another study conducted in January 2013 found that Ligandrol can help increase lean muscle mass, and was generally well tolerated by test subjects.

Adverse health effects
The FDA claims that "liver toxicity, adverse effects on blood lipid levels, and a potential to increase the risk of heart attack and stroke" are among the adverse health effects of SARMs.

Illicit use
Though not an approved drug, ligandrol has been sold on the black market in countries where it is classified as an illegal substance.

Ligandrol is on the World Anti-Doping Association list of prohibited drugs and has been found in drug testing samples of some athletes.

In 2015, the quarterback of the Florida Gators, Will Grier, was suspended for testing positive for ligandrol, a claim that the University of Florida denies.

In 2017, Joakim Noah was banned for twenty games by the NBA for testing positive for ligandrol.

In 2019, Australian swimmer Shayna Jack tested positive for ligandrol. She denies knowingly taking the substance.

In August 2019, it came to light that Canadian sprint canoeist Laurence Vincent Lapointe tested positive for ligandrol; the athlete denies knowingly taking a forbidden substance that resulted in her suspension from competition. The athlete remarked that the National Team Training Centre purchased nutritional supplements for its athletes and denied buying or taking nutritional supplements on her own.  On January 27, 2020, she was cleared of all charges. The substance was found in her results because of an exchange of bodily fluids with her boyfriend, who took Ligandrol.

In January 2020, Chilean ATP tennis singles competitor Nicolás Jarry tested positive for both ligandrol and stanozolol. He protested at the time that the multi-vitamins from Brazil that he took on the advice of an unnamed doctor were contaminated.

3 September 2022, Nzubechi Grace Nwokocha  was provisionally suspended for the use of banned substances https://www.reuters.com/lifestyle/sports/commonwealth-gold-medallist-nwokocha-provisionally-suspended-doping-2022-09-03/ by the Athletics Integrity Unit (AIU).

Commercial environment
Viking Therapeutics does not manufacture any pharmaceutical products, but is developing several products to treat metabolic and endocrine disorders. Thus, the company relies upon investments from stockholders and business partners. The company completed its initial public offering in the 2nd quarter of Fiscal Year 2015, generating $22.3M in net proceeds. Viking Therapeutics assumed the largest expense in 2014 from cited Research and Development costs ($21.2M), which may be related to purchase of required equipment and facilities to develop the drug candidates licensed by Ligand Pharmaceuticals in that year, including ligandrol.

Financial risks of development
Viking Therapeutics has yet to bring a drug to market. If one or several of their drug candidates does not pass clinical trials before one is successfully brought to market, then a significant amount of stockholders would likely sell their stocks, seriously reducing revenue and capability to continue development of ligandrol. Additionally, as noted in the Form 10-Q submitted on 10 November 2016, Viking relies heavily upon licensed technologies by Ligand Pharmaceutics. If Viking Therapeutics were to lose this license, then its operating capability would be severely impacted.

Other commercial aspects
Ligand Pharmaceutics has disclosed that its royalty fee incurred upon Viking Therapeutics for production and sale of ligandrol would be 7.25-9.25% of the product revenue.

Another promising drug candidate, VK2809, is expected to drive a major shift in the market cap of Viking Therapeutics and its share of the market for TRβ agonists, which is dominated by Madrigal Pharmaceuticals. This would improve the company portfolio as a whole, and would allow for greater capitalization upon the potential success of ligandrol.

Intellectual property
Ligand Pharmaceuticals has patents filed for the manufacture and therapeutic use of certain compounds occupying several stated chemical structures, which are intended for use as selective androgen receptor modulators. The patent is filed under the following designations: US8519158 B2, US8865918, US9359285, US20070254875, US20140005186, US20150099720, and WO2005090282A1. The patents will expire on March 12, 2025. These patents effectively protect any future capitalization upon ligandrol in the market by Viking and Ligand through their licensing agreement.

Regulatory information
In the United States, ligandrol is an Investigational New Drug.

Pre-clinical
Oral administration of the drug to cynomolgus monkeys at daily doses varying from 0 to 75 mg/kg over 13 weeks demonstrated significant body weight gain in both males and females. After 48 days, the 75 mg/kg dose testing was halted due to toxicity concerns, but this did not negatively impact development as the dose is significantly higher than those being utilized in the Phase 2 clinical trial.

Clinical trials
In a Phase 1 clinical trial of 76 adult male humans in which the dose size was varied, a dose-dependent increase in lean body mass was observed with no significant adverse events over 21 days.

The Phase 2 clinical trial, initiated on 3 November 2016, consists of 120 patients recovering from hip fracture surgery. The randomized study participants will receive either a placebo or varying dose sizes of LGD-4033 over a period of 12 weeks, with improved lean body mass as the primary endpoint. Other endpoints include satisfactory results in terms of quality of life, safety, and pharmacokinetics.

References

Experimental drugs
Pyrrolidines
Selective androgen receptor modulators
Trifluoromethyl compounds
World Anti-Doping Agency prohibited substances